Spencer Asah (c. 1908–1954) was a Kiowa painter and a member of the Kiowa Six from  Oklahoma.

Early life
Spencer Asah was born in 1908 in Carnegie, Oklahoma. His Kiowa name was Lallo (Little Boy). His father was a buffalo medicine man. Asah's father provided him with extensive cultural information that he later used in his art.

Asah attended St. Patrick's Mission School in Anadarko, Oklahoma, where he received his first art instruction from Sister Olivia Taylor, a Choctaw nun. Government field matron Susie Peters arranged for Mrs. Willie Baze Lane, an artist from Chickasha, Oklahoma, to provide further art instruction for young Kiowa artists, including Asah. Recognizing the talent of some of the young artists, Peters convinced Swedish-American artist Oscar Jacobson, director of the University of Oklahoma's School of Art, to accept the Kiowa students into a special program at the school, in which they were coached and encouraged by Edith Mahier.

Kiowa Six
The Kiowa Six, included six artists: Spencer Asah, James Auchiah, Jack Hokeah, Stephen Mopope, Lois Smoky Kaulaity, and Monroe Tsatoke. In 1926, Asah, Hokeah, Tsatoke, Mopope, and Smoky moved to Norman, Oklahoma and began their art studies at OU. Smoky returned home late in 1927, while Auchiah joined the group that year.

In 1928, the Kiowa Six had their major breakthrough into the international fine arts' world by exhibiting at the First International Art Exposition in Prague, Czechoslovakia. Dr. Jacobson arranged for their work to be shown in several other countries and for Kiowa Art, a portfolio of  pochoir print artists' paintings, to be published in France.  Towards the late 1920s, their critically acclaimed watercolor art works were being shown throughout the United States and Europe.

Public collections
Asah's work can be found in the following public art collections:

Anadarko City Museum
Denver Art Museum
Gilcrease Museum
Heard Museum
Indian Arts and Crafts Board, US Department of the Interior
Indian Arts and Crafts Board, Denman Collection
The George Gustav Heye Center
McNay Art Museum
Museum of Northern Arizona
Museum of Northern Arizona, Katherine Harvey Collection
Museum of New Mexico
Oklahoma Science and Art Foundation, Gerrer Collection
Fred Jones Jr. Museum of Art
Philbrook Museum of Art
Southern Plains Indian Museum
Woolaroc Museum

Later life
Spencer Asah was a traditional singer and dancer who was active in Oklahoma's powwow circuit. Asah married Ida, a Comanche woman, with whom he had three children. He died in 1954.

See also
List of Native American artists
Visual arts by indigenous peoples of the Americas

Notes

References
Lester, Patrick D. The Biographical Directory of Native American Painters. Norman: University of Oklahoma Press, 1995. .
Lydia L. Wyckoff, ed. Visions and voices : Native American painting from the Philbrook Museum of Art. Tulsa, OK: Philbrook Museum of Art, 1996.

External links
 Spencer Asah, article from the Oklahoma Historical Society
 Jacobson House Native Art Center: About the Kiowa Six

Kiowa people
Native American painters
Artists from Oklahoma
People from Carnegie, Oklahoma
20th-century births
1954 deaths
Year of birth uncertain
People from Norman, Oklahoma
People from Anadarko, Oklahoma